Sławomir "Sławek" Janicki (born 30 June 1980 in Łódź) is a Polish former ice dancer. He started skating at the age of 5. With Agnieszka Dulej, he is a four-time medalist at the Polish Figure Skating Championships. Janicki previously competed with Kamila Przyk.

Programs 
(with Dulej)

Competitive results

With Dulej

With Przyk

References

External links

1980 births
Polish male ice dancers
Living people
Sportspeople from Łódź